The First Drees cabinet, also called the Second Drees cabinet was the executive branch of the Dutch Government from 15 March 1951 until 2 September 1952. The cabinet was a continuation of the previous Drees–Van Schaik cabinet and was formed by the christian-democratic Catholic People's Party (KVP) and Christian Historical Union (CHU), the social-democratic Labour Party (PvdA) and the conservative-liberal People's Party for Freedom and Democracy (VVD) after the fall of the previous cabinet. The cabinet was a centrist grand coalition and had a substantial majority in the House of Representatives with Labour Leader Willem Drees serving as Prime Minister. Prominent Catholic politician Frans Teulings the Minister of the Interior in the previous cabinet served as Deputy Prime Minister and Minister without portfolio for the Interior.

The cabinet served during early years of the turbulent 1950s. Domestically the recovery and rebuilding following World War II continued with the assistance of the Marshall Plan, it also able to finalize several major social reforms to social security, welfare, child benefits and education from the previous cabinet. Internationally the decolonization of the Dutch East Indies following the Indonesian National Revolution continued, the European Coal and Steel Community was founded after the signing of the Treaty of Paris. The cabinet suffered no major internal and external conflicts and completed its entire term and was succeeded by the Second Drees cabinet following the election of 1952.

Cabinet Members

Trivia
 Nine cabinet members had previous experience as scholars and professors: Louis Beel (Administrative Law), Piet Lieftinck (Financial and Business Economics), Jan van den Brink (Public Economics and Economical Statistics), Dolf Joekes (Labour Law), Theo Rutten (Applied Psychology), Joris in 't Veld (Public Administration), Guus Albregts (International Economics), Piet Muntendam (Social Medicine) and Aat van Rhijn (Fiscal Law).

References

External links
Official

  Kabinet-Drees II Parlement & Politiek
  Kabinet-Drees I Rijksoverheid

Cabinets of the Netherlands
1951 establishments in the Netherlands
1952 disestablishments in the Netherlands
Cabinets established in 1951
Cabinets disestablished in 1952
Grand coalition governments